The Winkelman Bridge is a historic bridge over the Gila River in Winkelman, Arizona, U.S.. It was built in 1916. It has been listed on the National Register of Historic Places since September 30, 1988.

References

External links

Road bridges on the National Register of Historic Places in Arizona
Bridges completed in 1916
Buildings and structures in Pinal County, Arizona
Bridges over the Gila River
Concrete bridges in the United States
Arch bridges in the United States